An orphan source is a self-contained radioactive source that is no longer under regulatory control.

The United States Nuclear Regulatory Commission defines an orphan source more exactly as:

...a sealed source of radioactive material contained in a small volume—but not radioactively contaminated soils and bulk metals—in any one or more of the following conditions

In an uncontrolled condition that requires removal to protect public health and safety from a radiological threat
Controlled or uncontrolled, but for which a responsible party cannot be readily identified
Controlled, but the material's continued security cannot be assured. If held by a licensee, the licensee has few or no options for, or is incapable of providing for, the safe disposition of the material
In the possession of a person, not licensed to possess the material, who did not seek to possess the material
In the possession of a State radiological protection program for the sole purpose of mitigating a radiological threat because the orphan source is in one of the conditions described in one of the first four bullets and for which the State does not have a means to provide for the material's appropriate disposition

Most known orphan sources were, generally, small radioactive sources produced legitimately under governmental regulation and put into service for radiography, generating electricity in radioisotope thermoelectric generators, medical radiotherapy or irradiation. These sources were then "abandoned, lost, misplaced or stolen" and so no longer subject to proper regulation.

Notable orphan source incidents

 1962 Mexico City radiation accident - Mexico City, Mexico - A boy found and took home an industrial radiography source; he and three relatives died.

 1963 - Sanlian, China  

 1982 - Baku, Azerbaijan  

 1983 - Ciudad Juárez cobalt-60 contamination incident, Chihuahua, Mexico

 1984 - Casablanca, Morocco - A source was lost during radiography and taken home by other people who initially failed to recognize the source.

 1987 Goiânia accident - Goiás, Brazil - A caesium-137 based teletherapy unit left behind at Goiânia’s Instituto Goiano de Radioterapia. This event was rated as a 5 on the INES scale, making it one of the worst nuclear accidents to have occurred to date.

 1996 - Jilin, Xinzhou, China

 1996 - Gilan, Iran - A source was temporarily lost during radiography at a power plant and found by an unsuspecting worker who put the source in his chest pocket for about 90 minutes. One person was severely injured.

 1997 - Tbilisi, Georgia -  The Lilo Training Center had multiple sources dating back to Soviet-era military activity; 11 were injured.

 1999 - Kingisepp, Leningrad Oblast, Russia - Stolen from an RTG in a Russian lighthouse and then recovered 50 kilometres away at a bus station 

 1999 - Istanbul, Turkey -  A source was sold to a junkyard for its lead container in the district of İkitelli. 

 2000 - Samut Prakan radiation accident - Samut Prakan, Thailand - A defunct cobalt therapy machine was sold to a metal junkyard in Samut Prakan, leading to three deaths. 

 2000 - Meet-Halfa, Qalyubia Governorate, Egypt

 2001 - Lia radiological accident: Three woodcutters in northern Georgia found two Soviet-era RTG elements near the Inguri River containing strontium-90 and became sick from the high levels of radiation. As many as 300 orphan sources had been discovered in the country by 2006, when a team from the IAEA and Georgian government found two containing caesium-137 in the Racha region. One of the sources had been kept in a home, and another in an abandoned factory used as storage by farmers. 

 2008 - Karachi, Pakistan - An orphan source was discovered within the vicinity of the Oil & Gas Development Company Limited (OGDCL). Two containers were found buried which were suspected to be left over from Soviet oil drilling operations before the OGDCL took over in late 1960s.

 2010 Mayapuri radiological accident - Mayapuri, India. - An orphan source caused the death of one worker and irradiated seven others in a scrap yard. This event was rated as a 4 on the INES Scale.

 2011 - Prague, Czech Republic - A brachytherapy source was found buried in a Prague playground, radiating 500 µSv/h from one metre away.

 2013 - Hueypoxtla, Edomex, Mexico - A defunct cobalt therapy machine en route to proper disposal was stolen, apparently inadvertently, when the heavy truck transporting it was hijacked.
 2023 - Huston, Texas, United States of America - A radiographic camera containing radioactive material went missing from a work truck belonging to the Statewide Maintenance Company.

References

Radiation accidents and incidents